David Blodwell , DCL was Dean of St Asaph from 1455 until his death in 1461.

Blodwell was ordained at Ely cathedral on 21 December 1448. He was also a Prebendary of Hereford.

References 

15th-century Welsh clergy
Deans of St Asaph
1461 deaths
Alumni of the University of Cambridge